NGC 4886 is an elliptical galaxy located about 327 million light-years away in the constellation Coma Berenices. NGC 4886 was discovered by astronomer Heinrich d'Arrest on April 6, 1864. It was then rediscovered by d'Arrest on April 22, 1865, and was listed as NGC 4882. NGC 4886 is a member of the Coma Cluster.

See also 
 List of NGC objects (4001–5000)
 NGC 4889

References

External links
 

Coma Berenices
Coma Cluster
Elliptical galaxies
4886 
44698 
Astronomical objects discovered in 1864
+5-31-76